Raqiyah Mays (born November 11, 1975, in Newark, New Jersey) is an author, screenwriter, executive producer, podcaster, journalist, and former radio personality, Born in Newark, NJ, Raqiyah was featured in The Limited clothing store's 2015 nationwide "New Look of Leadership" campaign, honored as a female leader for her empowerment hard work.

Author
A writer at heart, Raqiyah's debut novel, The Man Curse, was released by Simon & Schuster on November 16, 2015. The Man Curse chronicles the world of Meena, a young woman who spends her life trying to break The Man Curse and become the first woman in her family to marry. No stranger to the book world, Raqiyah contributed a chapter to Gil Robertson's anthology Where Did Our Love Go: Love & Relationships in the African American Community (Bolden/Agate). She was a featured profile in Thembisa Mshaka's book of entertainment industry professionals, Put Your Dreams First: Handle your entertainment business (Hachette), and Raqiyah was reporter at large for Cheo Hodari Coker's VIBE book Unbelievable: The Life, Death, and Afterlife of The Notorious B.I.G (Three Rivers Press), which was turned into the critically acclaimed feature film, Notorious.

Journalist 
Raqiyah's work in journalism goes back to the Quincy Jones owned days of Vibe Magazine. As an intern in the mid-90s, she became Executive Assistant to then editor-in-chief, Danyel Smith. And later, editorial coordinator assisting the managing editor. Moving on to pursue an early career as a freelance hip hop journalist, Raqiyah's bylines graced cover stories for publications like XXL, The Source, and Billboard. Expanding her beat to report on everything from women and R&B to politics and radio, she scored covers for XXL, The Source, Black Elegance magazine, profiles, and features for The Associated Press, VIBE, Essence, Ebony, Billboard, and Complex. She later became a founder and executive editor of The Ave Magazine, dedicated to coverage combining social issues with the intellect and outlook of the hip hop world.

Radio personality 
Raqiyah's radio experience goes back 20 years to her days at Hampton University on WHOV FM hosting the late-night hip hop show The Underground Review. Her move to New York to pursue a journalism career with Vibe Magazine, led to the weekly show High Vision on City College's WHCR-FM, where Raqiyah brought her passion for combining social issues with hip hop music to the airwaves over five years. She left WHCR for Sirius Satellite Radio, where as a feature content producer she created content and wrote for Rock, pop, hip hop, reggae, and alternative channels along with producing a show hosted by DJ Grandmaster Flash. She also hosted shows on Top 40 Channel US 1, and R&B channel Hot Jamz. In a few short months, Raqiyah was hired as a weekend host on NY's Power 105. And after a year, she joined NY's Hot 97, where over five years she held a No. 1 weekly Sunday afternoon show before transitioning to become morning show entertainment reporter on 98.7 Kiss FM's the "Wake Up Club." Featuring radio veterans Jeff Foxx, Shaila, Bob Slade, and comedian Talent, The Wake Up Club drew top NYC ratings before being replaced by The DL Hughley Morning Show. Raqiyah moved on to also join Hughley, handpicked by DL to provide entertainment and colorful peanut crew commentary during her run on the now syndicated show. She left New York's No. 1 station, 107.5 WBLS in 2019. In the fall of 2019, her podcast Real Black News was named one of the top 50 podcasts in the US according to UVM.

TV personality 
In 2009, named one of VH1's "Future Leaders of Black History," Raqiyah was featured in their Black History Month TV commercial campaign. A trained actress, she performed off-Broadway for five years, touring the country and appearing on stages nationwide as a cast member with the hit play Platanos & Collard Greens. Her numerous TV appearances have included correspondent work on Black Enterprise's TVOne /ABC news show Our World, being a regular guest co-host on Arise TV's film review show On Screen, and MTV, BET, VH1, the Fuse Network, and Fox News.

Activist 
Raqiyah is a passionate activist for issues affecting women, children, and African Americans. As a child, Raqiyah was a girl scout who became president of Edison, NJ's NAACP Youth Council. In college, she helped create the Diversity Union on Penn State University's Altoona campus after acts of racism toward black classmates. Participating in student politics, she regularly represented the campus during Penn State's gathering of student government officers. After moving to New York, Raqiyah organized community and youth events in Brooklyn. While spending time in Los Angeles, she coordinated fundraising events for non-profits along with training canvassers and managing outreach campaigns in both LA and NY for organizations like The Southern Poverty Law Center, Planned Parenthood, and the ACLU. She uses her journalism skills and celebrity interviews to humanize the entertainment world with shared superstar views on real life, social issues, and outlooks on making change today.

Footnotes

External links

Raqiyah Mays Wordpress

American radio personalities
Living people
1978 births
Writers from Newark, New Jersey
People from Piscataway, New Jersey